Epithelantha (button cactus) is a genus of cactus that is native to north-eastern Mexico, and the south-western United States from western Texas to Arizona. There are eight species recognised in the genus Epithelantha. The name Epithelantha refers to the flower position near the apex of the tubercles.

Description
Epithelantha are very small cacti with globe-shaped or cylindrical stems typically up to one inch in diameter, rarely reaching two inches long. Tiny whitish spines completely cover the surface of the stem. The flowers are also tiny, growing from the tip of the stem. Fruits are bright red.

The fruit of all species is said to be edible.

Species
, Plants of the World Online accepted eight species:

References

Cactoideae genera
Cactoideae